Birmingham City Council elections are held every four years. Birmingham City Council is the local authority for the metropolitan district of Birmingham in the West Midlands, England. Since the last boundary changes in 2018, 101 councillors have been elected from 69 wards. Prior to 2018 elections were held three years out of every four, with a third of the council elected each time.

Political control
From 1889 to 1974 Birmingham was a county borough, independent of any county council. Under the Local Government Act 1972 it had its territory enlarged and became a metropolitan borough, with West Midlands County Council providing county-level services. The first election to the reconstituted city council was held in 1973, initially operating as a shadow authority before coming into its revised powers on 1 April 1974. West Midlands County Council was abolished in 1986 and Birmingham became a unitary authority. Political control of the council since 1974 has been held by the following parties:

Leadership

The role of Lord Mayor of Birmingham is largely ceremonial, with political leadership provided by the leader of the council. The first leader of the council after the 1974 reforms, Clive Wilkinson, had been the leader of the old county borough of Birmingham since December 1973. The leaders since 1974 have been:

Council elections

Result maps

By-election results

2013–2017

Resignation of Labour Cllr Sam Burden.

Death of Lib Dem Cllr Ray Hassall.

Resignation of Labour Cllr Cath Grundy.

2009–2013

2005–2009

2001–2005

1997–2001

Death of Labour Cllr David Wells.

Death of Labour Cllr Anthony Rust.

1993–1997

Death of Lib Dem Cllr Neil Biddlestone.

Death of Labour Cllr Edward Rochford.

Death of Labour Cllr Paul Haymeraj.

Death of Conservative Cllr Arthur Walker.

Death of Conservative Cllr Clare Fancote.

Resignation of Labour Cllr Khalid Mahmood.

Resignation of Lib Dem Cllr Paul Shefield.

Resignation of Labour Cllr Fred Grattidge.

Before 1993

References

External links
 Birmingham City Council
 Local Authority Byelection Results 

 
Birmingham
Council elections
Council
Birmingham